The qualification for the 2014 Women's European Water Polo Championship were played between 16 and 19 January 2014. The teams are in two groups.

Group A

Group B

References

Women
Women's European Water Polo Championship
Euro